Ludza District was an administrative division of Latvia, located in Latgale region, in the country's east.

Districts were eliminated during the administrative-territorial reform in 2009.

Towns of Ludza District 
Kārsava
Ludza (district centre)
Zilupe

Provinces and parishes of Ludza District 

Blonti parish
Brigi parish
Cibla municipality
Cirma parish
Goliševa parish
Isnauda parish
Istra parish
Lauderi parish
Malnava parish
Mērdzene parish
Mežvidi parish
Nirza parish
Ņukši parish
Pasiene parish
Pilda parish
Pureņi parish
Pušmucova parish
Rundēni parish
Salnava parish
Zilupe municipality
Zvirgzdene parish

Districts of Latvia